The 1898 Rutgers Queensmen football team represented Rutgers University as an independent during the 1898 college football season. In their first season under head coach William V. B. Van Dyck, the Queensmen compiled a 1–6–1 record and were outscored by their opponents, 114 to 16.  The team captain was William F. McMahon.

Schedule

References

Rutgers
Rutgers Scarlet Knights football seasons
Rutgers Queensmen football